Gem City may refer to:

 Gem, Indiana
 Gem, Kansas

It may also refer to any of the following cities which are known by the nickname Gem City:

 Monrovia, California, the "Gem City of the Foothills"
 Quincy, Illinois
 Diamond, Missouri
 Dayton, Ohio
 Toronto, Ohio
 Erie, Pennsylvania
 Lynden, Washington
 Laramie, Wyoming, the "Gem City of the Plains"

See also 
Gemcity
Gem City in Vietnam